
Rogagua Lake is a lake in the pampas area in the northern Bolivia, in the José Ballivián Province of the Beni Department.

Laguna Rogagua and some smaller lakes are north of Santa Rosa, Beni, Bolivia, and north east of Rurrenabaque and Reyes, Bolivia. Some of the popular pampas tours from Rurrenabaque go to the area of Laguna Rogagua or to the area of the Yacuma River.

Partial and shortened translation from the Spanish Wikipedia:

Rogagua Lake is a tropical Bolivian fresh water lake, located in the Amazonian river basin of the Beni Department. The Lake is 21 km in length by 9 km and has an area of 155 km² and perimeter of 52 kilometers, and is thus one of greatest lakes of Bolivia. Rogagua is an important reservoir for fresh water and wild life.

Lakes of Beni Department